The men's coxed four (M4+) competition at the 1976 Summer Olympics took place at the rowing basin on Notre Dame Island in Montreal, Quebec, Canada. It was held from 18 to 25 July and was won by the team from Soviet Union. There were 14 boats (71 competitors, with the Soviet Union making one substitution) from 14 nations, with each nation limited to a single boat in the event. The victory was the Soviet Union's first medal in the men's coxed four. East Germany took its third consecutive silver medal, with entirely different crews each time. The defending champion West Germany received bronze this time. Hans-Johann Färber, the only rower from the 1972 gold medal team to return, became the fifth man to earn multiple medals in the event.

Background

This was the 15th appearance of the event. Rowing had been on the programme in 1896 but was cancelled due to bad weather. The coxed four was one of the four initial events introduced in 1900. It was not held in 1904 or 1908, but was held at every Games from 1912 to 1992 when it (along with the men's coxed pair) was replaced with the men's lightweight double sculls and men's lightweight coxless four.

While West Germany had won the previous Olympic event in 1972, the Soviet Union had since won most of the relevant competitions: the 1973 European Rowing Championships (the event was discontinued after 1973) and the 1975 World Rowing Championships. In the 1974 World Rowing Championships, the Soviet Union won silver. East Germany had won silver at the 1972 Summer Olympics and had since won silver at the 1973 European Rowing Championships, gold at the 1974 World Rowing Championships, and silver in the following year. West Germany had not made the A final at the 1973 European Rowing Championships, but had won bronze at both the subsequent world championships. The only other country that had won medals in these events was Czechoslovakia, having won bronze in both 1972 and 1973.

Bulgaria and Ireland each made their debut in the event. The United States made its 13th appearance, most among nations to that point.

Previous M4+ competitions

Competition format

The coxed four event featured five-person boats, with four rowers and a coxswain. It was a sweep rowing event, with the rowers each having one oar (and thus each rowing on one side). The competition used the 2000 metres distance that became standard at the 1912 Olympics and which has been used ever since except at the 1948 Games.

The tournament used the four-round format (three main rounds and a repechage) that had been used in 1968. The competition continued to use the six-boat heat standardised in 1960 as well as the "B" final for ranking 7th through 12th place introduced in 1964.

 Quarterfinals: Three heats of 4 or 5 boats each. The top three boats in each heat (9 total) advanced directly to the semifinals. The remaining boats (5 total) went to the repechage.
 Repechage: One heat of 5 boats. The top three boats rejoined the quarterfinal winners in the semifinals. The other boats (2 total) were eliminated.
 Semifinals: Two heats of 6 boats each. The top three boats in each heat (6 total) advanced to Final A, the remaining boats (6 total) went to Final B.
 Final: Two finals. Final A consisted of the top 6 boats. Final B placed boats 7 through 12.

Schedule

All times are Eastern Daylight Time (UTC-4)

Results

Quarterfinals

Three heats were rowed on 18 July. Two of the heats had five teams and one had four teams, with the first three teams to qualify for the semifinals, and the remaining teams progressing to the repechage.

Quarterfinal 1

Quarterfinal 2

Quarterfinal 3

Repechage

One heat was rowed in the repechage on 20 July. Of the five teams competing, the first three progressed to the semifinals. Poland swapped seats 2 and 4 for this race. The team from Bulgaria swapped three of the seats for the repechage. Italy swapped seats 1 to 3. Norway swapped seats 2 to 4. Argentina and Norway were eliminated in the repechage.

Semifinals

Two heats were rowed in the semifinals on 23 July. Of the six teams competing per heat, the first three would qualify for the A final, while the others would progress to the B final.

Semifinal 1

East Germany swapped the seats of all four rowers. The New Zealanders swapped seats 2 and 4. The United States swapped seats 2 to 4. The Dutch changed the seats of all four rowers. The French team swapped the stroke with seat 3.

Semifinal 2

The team from the Soviet Union replaced Aleksandr Sema with Mikhail Kuznetsov. The team from West Germany swapped seats 2 and 3. Ireland swapped rowers in seats 1, 2, and 4.

Finals

The two finals were rowed on 25 July.

Final B

In the B final, the Dutch team changed seats 2 to 4. The team from the USA swapped the stroke with seat 4.

Final A

The team from the Soviet Union swapped rowers in seats 3 and 4. The East German Dießner twins swapped their seats. The Czechoslovakian, Bulgarian, and New Zealand teams changed seats for all four rowers.

Notes

References

Volume 1 Part 1 (up to page 279)
Volume 1 Part 1 (from page 280)
Volume 2
Volume 3

Men's coxed four
Men's events at the 1976 Summer Olympics